Imperfect (lit. Imperfect: Career, Love & Scales) is a 2019 Indonesian drama film directed and co-written by Ernest Prakasa. The film was adapted from the novel, Imperfect: A Journey to Self-Acceptance, written by Meira Anastasia. It was released on 19 December 2019.

Premise
Rara, a messy and overweight research associate, lives in a world in which appearance matters. She orders her world by a close relationship with her boyfriend, Dika and his mother, also her best friend, Fey. Everything starts to change when she is promoted as the marketing manager, but is judged based on her appearance, deemed as "not presentable". Then, she decides to challenge her boss that she should be given the position if she manages to lose weight and change her appearance.

Cast
Jessica Mila as Rara
Reza Rahadian as Dika
Yasmin Napper as Lulu
Karina Suwandi as Debby
Shareefa Daanish as Fey
Dion Wiyoko as Kelvin
Boy William as George
Clara Bernadeth as Marsha
Dewi Irawan as Ratih
Ernest Prakasa as Teddy

Production
On 29 November 2018, Ernest Prakasa announced that he would adapt, his wife, Meira Anastasia's novel Imperfect: A Journey to Self-Acceptance into a film. He also revealed that the screenplay was mainly written by Anastasia. It was revealed on 20 June 2019 that Jessica Mila and Reza Rahadian were set to star in the film. Prakasa revealed that he had aimed for Rahadian to star in one of his films.

The filming was divided into two phases and started on 28 July 2019 in Jakarta, Bogor, Depok, Tangerang, and Bekasi.

Release
The film was released nationwide on 19 December 2019. It garnered 127,038 moviegoers in the film's release date. It became the second most-watched Indonesian film of 2019 with 2,662,356 moviegoers.

Accolades

References

Indonesian comedy-drama films
2019 comedy-drama films
Films about bullying